is a Japanese manga series by Higasa Akai. It was serialized in Square Enix's shōnen manga magazine Monthly GFantasy from November 2013 to May 2021. It has been collected in seventeen tankōbon volumes as of August 2021. Yen Press has licensed the manga and distribute monthly chapters digitally. An anime television adaptation by Bridge that started from April 4, 2017 to June 20, 2017. A stage play has been announced as well. A new project has been announced. On September 17, 2018, it was announced that a film produced by Tear Studio would be released on February 16, 2019.

Plot
Heine Wittgenstein, a man often mistaken for a small child, has been summoned to the royal palace of Glanzreich by the king to act as the royal tutor to the four younger princes—Kai, Bruno, Leonhard, and Licht–turning them into capable candidates to the throne. However, he finds his task difficult because of the complicated personalities of his charges, who had managed to cause every tutor they had to quit.

Characters

Main Characters

The titular royal tutor. Heine is an adult man who is often mistaken for a child due to his short stature. In contrast to his childlike looks, he's a very serious person who doesn't show much emotion, except when it comes to being mistaken for a child. He has a multitude of talents, and is stern but kind towards his charges. Not much is known about his past, except that he apparently knew the king long before he came to the palace to take up his duties, used to tutor at a church (he still does), and was a violent man in the past. He also was accused of being a criminal in the past, which turns out to be a false accusation.

The 17-year-old second prince, nicknamed "The Glaring Prince". He has a reputation of being aloof and scary, and it's rumored that he was kicked out of the military academy for getting into brawls. As it turns out, he was suspended because he beat a student who bullied and abused his brother Bruno. He's actually a kindhearted, introverted young man who's bad at social interactions and likes cute and soft things. He likes Heine because he's the first tutor to actually talk to him and because he thinks of him as a cute pet. He is mistaken as scary because he has trouble speaking and often looks as if he is glaring due to his naturally sharp eyes. In the later chapters of the manga, Kai has returned to Military Academy and is currently away on a training trip.

The 16-year-old third prince, nicknamed "The Browbeating Brainiac Prince". He's considered to be a child prodigy and a genius. At first, he's dismissive of Heine because he never went to university and assumed that there's nothing that he could teach him, but his attitude changes when Heine beats him soundly in all the challenges he imposes on him, such as chess and mathematics. He starts to idolize him after that and calls him "master", much to Heine's chagrin. In the later chapters of the manga, he has left the palace to travel to his admired professor's country as a consort.

The 15-year-old fourth prince, nicknamed "The Everest-Pride Prince". He considers himself the most beautiful person on the continent. However, it's quickly revealed that behind his haughty demeanor, he is actually a very childish person prone to sulking and running away from his problems. He's a slow learner and has an intense hatred of teachers because he was abused by them, though this slowly starts to change because of Heine's influence. He looks up to his older brother Bruno. He is extremely athletic and appears to love torte. Although he is not too intelligent, his simplistic way of thinking actually helps in creating solutions to certain problems. He often acts as a tsundere, pretending to be mean but in actuality wanting to be paid attention to and particularly enjoys being praised.

The 14-year-old fifth and youngest prince, nicknamed "The Playboy Prince". He's very cheerful and easy-going and is fond of being surrounded by beautiful women. He has a tendency to sneak out into town, because of his secret job as a waiter at a café. He's surprisingly a perceptive and serious young man despite his flamboyant image. He occasionally clashes with Bruno.

Other members of the Glanzreich Family

The current King of Glanzreich and the father of the five princes and princess. He ascended to the throne at a young age and is known for his wisdom and for his apparently eternal youth. He gets surprisingly emotional when seeing his children after a long time away or if only a few hours have passed.

The youngest child of the Glanzreich family and the only girl. She is a cheerful, playful three-year-old who enjoys coloring and playing with the royal dog, Shadow. She is already engaged to a foreign prince.

The eldest prince. He is a genius who is the overwhelming favorite to succeed the throne. However, Viktor considers him to be unfit for the throne due to reasons like he can’t speak with women for a long time caused by a youthful breakup that he haven’t overcome.

The queen of Glanzreich, wife of Victor and mother of all the royal family. She has a clumsu personality, but she is an intelligent and powerfull businesswoman. She loves her sons and daughter, even she had passed a depression when she can’t take care them after the partum. In general, she is very similar to Victor, talented but very emotional in her private life.

Other Characters

A palace guard from a well-to-do family. He has a cheerful demeanor. He's known as the greatest fencer among the guards. He's Ernst Rosenberg's cousin.

A palace guard from a commoner family. He has a serious demeanor.

A count who's also the high steward of the eldest prince Eins. He's been behind many of the obstacles that stand between the four princes and their paths to the throne, such as being the one to tell on Licht's secret job as waiter to his father, and introducing Bruno to the professor he admires in hopes that he removes himself from the race to the throne in order to study abroad in the professor's country. He's Maximilian's cousin.

Ralf is a former student of the military academy that Bruno and Kai formerly attended. Jealous of Bruno's success at the academy, Fuchs wrongfully believed that Bruno's grades were unjustly granted due to his royal lineage. This led him to attack Bruno. Kai, having defended his brother, was suspended from the academy and branded as violent. Despite this, Kai later attempted to apologize. Ralf von Fuchs is currently in prison for abducting and threatening Kai, Heine, and Maximillion.

An original character created for The Royal Tutor: The Movie, Ivan is the first prince of the Romano family who Heine nicknames the "Jack-knife Prince." He is abrasive and quick to dismiss performance arts due to his strict upbringing and pressure brought upon by his father.

An original character created for The Royal Tutor: The Movie, Eugene is the second prince of the Romano family and Ivan's younger twin brother. Heine nicknames him the "Darkside Prince", and despite Eugene's even temperament, he gives up easily. He is talented at singing, which he keeps hidden from his father.

Media

Manga
Written and illustrated by Higasa Akai, The Royal Tutor was serialized in Square Enix's shōnen manga magazine Monthly GFantasy from November 18, 2013, to May 18, 2021. Square Enix has published the compiled volumes since June 27, 2014. Currently there are twelve volumes. Yen Press had announced its license of the series in 2015, and they are currently releasing translated chapters monthly digitally.

Volume list

Anime
An anime television series adaptation by Bridge aired from April 4, 2017 to June 20, 2017.

Musicals
The series has inspired two musicals, with the voice cast of the anime reprising their roles. The first play ran in 2017. The second play ran in April 2019 as a tie-in to the anime film, with Shohei Hashimoto and Shogo Sakamoto reprising their roles.

Film
The Royal Tutor: The Movie was announced in November 2018 and cast Shohei Hashimoto and Shogo Sakamoto as Ivan and Eugene, two original characters made for the film. The film was released nationwide in Japan on February 16, 2019. Crunchyroll distributed the film for English release on its release day.

Note

References

External links
The Royal Tutor at Square Enix 
Official anime website 

2017 anime television series debuts
Anime series based on manga
Bridge (studio)
Crunchyroll anime
Funimation
Gangan Comics manga
Historical anime and manga
Manga adapted into television series
Shōnen manga
Square Enix franchises
Tear Studio
TV Tokyo original programming
Yen Press titles